{{DISPLAYTITLE:Upsilon2 Cassiopeiae}}

Upsilon2 Cassiopeiae, Latinised from υ2 Cassiopeiae, is a solitary star in the constellation of Cassiopeia, a few degrees to the south of Gamma Cassiopeiae. It has the proper name Castula , which has been officially adopted by the IAU. The star has a yellow hue and is faintly visible to the naked eye with an apparent visual magnitude of +4.62. Based upon parallax measurements, it is located at a distance of approximately 189 light years from the Sun. The star is drifting closer with a radial velocity of −48 km/s.

With the supply of core hydrogen exhausted, this star has cooled and expanded off the main sequence – at present it has 10 times the girth of the Sun. It is a red clump giant, which means it is on the horizontal branch undergoing core helium fusion.

Upsilon2 Cassiopeiae is a barium star, showing an excess of the element barium in its spectrum. This can occur from mass transfer from a more-evolved companion star that later became a white dwarf, although no companion has been detected. It is 2.2 billion years old with 1.44 times the mass of the Sun. The star is radiating 55 times the luminosity of the Sun from its enlarged photosphere at an effective temperature of 4,937 K.

Nomenclature 

υ2 Cassiopeiae is the star's Bayer designation. In 2016, the IAU organized a Working Group on Star Names (WGSN) to catalog and standardize proper names for stars. The WGSN approved the name Castula for this star on 5 September 2017 and it is now so included in the List of IAU-approved Star Names.

References

G-type giants
Barium stars
Horizontal-branch stars

Cassiopeiae, Upsilon2
Cassiopeia (constellation)
Durchmusterung objects
Cassiopeiae, 28
005395
004422
0265